Friedrich "Fritz" Künzli (8 January 1946 – 22 December 2019) was a Swiss football player. From 1961 to 1979 he played in 313 matches in the Nationalliga A scoring a record 201 goals. In 1978, he played part of one season in the North American Soccer League.

He was a leading goal scorer four times in the league and is one of only three players to lead the league in goals for two different clubs. He achieved his greatest success teaming with Köbi Kuhn at FC Zürich, winning two league championships, and four Swiss Cups.

He earned 44 caps and scored 15 goals for Switzerland between 17 October 1965 and 16 November 1977. His international career includes two matches in the 1966 World Cup.

After retiring from football, he operated a restaurant in Zürich with his wife, former actress and model, Monika Kaelin. He died on 22 December 2019, having suffered from Alzheimer's disease in his later years.

Honors 
2x League champion 1965–1966, 1967–1968
4x League Leading Scorer, 1966–1967, 1967–1968, 1969–1970, 1977–1978
4x Swiss Cup champion 1966, 1970, 1972 and 1973

References

External links
NASL stats

1946 births
2019 deaths
Swiss men's footballers
Swiss expatriate footballers
Switzerland international footballers
1966 FIFA World Cup players
FC Zürich players
FC Winterthur players
FC Lausanne-Sport players
San Diego Sockers (NASL) players
Houston Hurricane players
North American Soccer League (1968–1984) players
Association football forwards
Expatriate soccer players in the United States
Swiss expatriate sportspeople in the United States
People from Glarus